The 1999 Nigerian Senate election in Kano State was held on February 20, 1999, to elect members of the Nigerian Senate to represent Kano State. Bello Hayatu Gwarzo representing Kano North, Masʽud El-Jibril representing Kano South, and Ibrahim Kura Mohammed representing Kano Central won on the platform of the Peoples Democratic Party.

Overview

Summary

Results

Kano North 
The election was won by Bello Hayatu Gwarzo of the Peoples Democratic Party.

Kano Central 
The election was won by Ibrahim Kura Mohammed of the Peoples Democratic Party.

Kano South 
The election was won by Masʽud El-Jibril of the Peoples Democratic Party.

References 

Kan
Kan
Kano State Senate elections